The 1905–06 Harvard Crimson men's ice hockey season was the ninth season of play for the program.

Season
For the fourth straight year Harvard finished undefeated, claiming the intercollegiate title. While their winning streak came to an end at 30 their intercollegiate winning streak was continued at 20 games. Harvard entered the game against Yale with both teams undefeated in conference play. Harvard scored 3 times in the first half but were equaled by the Elis in the second. Because the victory would win the IHA championship the game continued on through four scoreless sessions before Richard Townsend ended the game in the fifth 5-minute overtime. The title game possessed the most overtime periods Harvard has ever played, however, because regulation was only 40 minutes, the game time was swiftly surpassed once the college game shifted to three 20-minute periods.

Roster

Standings

Schedule and Results

|-
!colspan=12 style=";" | Regular Season

Scoring Statistics

Note: Assists were not recorded as a statistic.

References

Harvard Crimson men's ice hockey seasons
Harvard
Harvard
Harvard
Harvard
Harvard